The  is a group of Kofun period burial mounds located in the Mihata neighborhood of the city of Nabari, Mie in the Kansai region of Japan. It was designated a National Historic Site of Japan in 1978. It is the largest group of kofun in the Iga region.

Overview
The Mihata Kofun Cluster is located in the Nabari Basin, and currently consists of seven tumuli. One is a circular-type, with a horizontal stone-lined burial chamber, and one is a square-type. The oldest dates from the latter half of the 5th century AD and it is speculated that these were the graves of the pre-Yamato conquest chieftains of the Iga region. There were once more tumuli scattered around this vicinity, but the others have been lost to urban development. 

The 88 meter-long Tonozuka Kofun on the northeastern plateau edge is the oldest of the tumuli, from which fragments of horse fittings have been excavated. Approximately 300 meters to the southwest are the 100 meter Jōrōzuka Kofun  and the Bishamonzuka Kofun, both of which have moats. Approximately 800 meters south of Bishamonzuka Kofun is the Umazuka Kofun which is the largest in the group with a total length of 142 meters. It has a moat 7 to 25 meters wide. A short distance to the east is the square Kozuka Kofun, and 600 meters southeast is the 55-meter long Kijinzuka Kofun, which has a shallow moat with a width of about 6 meters, and which is thought to date from the beginning of the 6th century. On the right bank of the Obata River, which is about 1.5 kilometers south of the Kijinzuka Kofun, is the Akaizuka Kofun, a circular burial mound with a diameter of about 30 meters. 

The Umazuka Kofun is about a five-minute walk from Mihata Station on the Kintetsu Osaka Line.

Gallery

See also
List of Historic Sites of Japan (Mie)

References

External links

Mie Prefecture Department of Education 
Nabari City official report 

Kofun
Archaeological sites in Japan
History of Mie Prefecture
Nabari, Mie
Historic Sites of Japan
Iga Province